Global Heritage Fund is a non-profit organization that operates internationally. 
Founded in California in 2002, its mission is to "transform local communities by investing in global heritage."

To date, it has partnered with over 100 public and private organizations at 28 sites across 19 countries, investing over $30 million and securing $25 million in co-funding to carry out heritage preservation and socio-economic development.

Global Heritage Fund projects
Projects are selected by Global Heritage Fund's Senior Advisory Board. Global Heritage Fund states that selection is based on a number of factors, including cultural significance of site, need of country or region in question, and high potential for sustainable preservation through community involvement.

Projects
Global Heritage Fund has current or past projects in the following locations:
 Amer Fort*, India
 Amtoudi, Morocco
 Ayios Vasileios, Greece
 Banteay Chhmar, Cambodia
Çatalhöyük, Turkey
 Chavín de Huántar*, Peru
La Ciudad Perdida, Colombia
 Collective Granaries, Morocco
 Cyrene*, Libya
 Daia, Romania
 Dali Dong Village, Guizhou, China
 Foguang Temple*, China
 Göbekli Tepe*, Turkey
 Hampi*, India
 Izborsk, Russia
 Kars, Turkey
 Lijiang*, China
 Maijishan, China
 Mirador, Guatemala
 My Son*, Vietnam
 Patan Durbar*, Nepal
 Pingyao*, China
 Sagalassos, Turkey
 Wat Phu*, Laos
(* indicates a UNESCO World Heritage Site)

Global Heritage Fund UK 
Global Heritage Fund registered as a charity in England and Wales in 2006, extending Global Heritage Fund's network of members, staff, and technical experts throughout the United Kingdom and Europe. Global Heritage Fund UK shares the Global Heritage Fund mission to transform local communities by investing in global heritage.

Global Heritage Fund UK Board of Trustees members include Patrick Franco, James Hooper, Nada Hosking, and Princess Alia Al-Senussi.

Prince Richard, Duke of Gloucester, KG, GCVO is the Royal Patron of Global Heritage Fund and Global Heritage Fund UK.

Global Heritage Fund Asia 
Based in Hong Kong, Global Heritage Fund Asia shares the Global Heritage Fund mission to transform local communities by investing in global heritage. Global Heritage Fund Asia Board of Directors members include Angus Forsyth, Nada Hosking, and Daniel K. Thorne.

Recent initiatives

AMAL in Heritage 
Global Heritage Fund developed AMAL in Heritage in partnership with ICOMOS-ICORP, ICCROM, and other conservation institutions to document site-specific risk in the cultural heritage sector by providing state of the art tools for preparedness, response, and recovery. The AMAL in Heritage mobile app launched in August 2017.

By monitoring sites before and in the immediate aftermath of a disaster, AMAL preserves crucial information that can be used to repair or reconstruct historic structures. The user-friendly technology also supports locals around heritage sites where access to expertise is challenging.

In the wake of the August 2020 port explosion in Lebanon, Global Heritage Fund launched a campaign to deliver AMAL in Heritage to the people of Beirut in partnership with the Lebanese Department of Antiquities (DGA). A local team recorded and assessed over 200 buildings in two days using the AMAL toolkit. This information was passed to a copy of Oxford University’s Endangered Archaeology in the Middle East and North Africa (EAMENA) Project that is specific to Lebanon and managed by the DGA.

Global Heritage Network
In 2010, Global Heritage Fund launched Global Heritage Network (GHN), an early warning and threats monitoring system that uses satellite imaging technology and ground reporting to enable international experts and local conservation leaders to clearly identify and solve imminent threats within the legal core and protected areas of each site.

Saving Our Vanishing Heritage
In October 2010, Global Heritage Fund produced a report titled Saving Our Vanishing Heritage: Safeguarding Endangered Cultural Heritage Sites in the Developing World. The report listed 500 major archaeological and heritage sites in developing countries, evaluating their current loss and destruction, conservation and development. It identified nearly 200 of these sites as "At Risk” or “Under Threat,” and 12 as “On the Verge” of irreparable loss and destruction. The Vanishing report stated that there were five accelerating man-made threats facing global heritage sites in developing countries: development pressures, unsustainable tourism, insufficient management, looting, and war and conflict.

Partners 
Global Heritage Fund has worked with over one hundred partners worldwide, including local community boards, NGOs, private sector companies, and local and national governmental bodies. Global Heritage Fund partners include Google Arts & Culture, American Express, Intrepid Foundation (the not-for-profit entity of Intrepid Travel), the A.G. Leventis Foundation, Grow Annenberg, and the J.M. Kaplan Fund.

References

Heritage organizations
Historic preservation
Archaeological organizations
Charities based in California